State Savings Bank may refer to:

State Savings Bank (Council Bluffs, Iowa), listed on the National Register of Historic Places in Pottawattamie County, Iowa
State Savings Bank (Logan, Iowa), listed on the National Register of Historic Places in Harrison County, Iowa
State Savings Bank (Quasqueton, Iowa), listed on the National Register of Historic Places in Buchanan County, Iowa
Savoyard Centre, also known as State Savings Bank, Detroit, Michigan, listed on NRHP in Wayne County, Michigan
State Savings Bank of Ukraine, also known as Savings Bank or Oshchad Bank
Queensland Government Savings Bank, a former bank in Australia